North-Central American English (in the United States, also known as the Upper Midwestern or North-Central dialect and stereotypically recognized as a Minnesota accent or Wisconsin accent) is an American English dialect native to the Upper Midwestern United States, an area that somewhat overlaps with speakers of the separate Inland North dialect situated more in the eastern Great Lakes region. The North-Central dialect is considered to have developed in a residual dialect region from the neighboring distinct dialect regions of the Western United States, Inland North, and Canada.

If a strict cot–caught merger is used to define the North-Central regional dialect, it covers the Upper Peninsula of Michigan, the northern border of Wisconsin, the whole northern half of Minnesota, some of northern South Dakota, and most of North Dakota; otherwise, the dialect may be considered to extend to all of Minnesota, North Dakota, most of South Dakota, northern Iowa, and all of Wisconsin outside of the eastern ridges and lowlands.

History and geography

The appearance of monophthongs in this region is sometimes attributed to the high degree of Scandinavian and German immigration to these northern states in the late 19th century. Linguist Erik R. Thomas argues that these monophthongs are the product of language contact and notes that other areas where they occur are places where speakers of other languages have had an influence such as the Pennsylvania "Dutch" region. An alternative account posits that these monophthongal variants represent historical retentions, since diphthongization of the mid vowels seems to have been a relatively recent phenomenon in the history of the English language, appearing within the last few centuries, and did not affect all dialects in the U.K. The monophthongs heard in this region may stem from the influence of Scots-Irish or other British dialects that maintain such forms. The fact that the monophthongs also appear in Canadian English may lend support to this account since Scots-Irish speech is known as an important influence in Canada.

People living in the Upper Peninsula of Michigan (whose demonym, and sometimes sub-dialect, is known as "Yooper," deriving from the acronym "U.P." for "Upper Peninsula"), many northern areas of the Lower Peninsula of Michigan, and in Northern Wisconsin are largely of Finnish, French Canadian, Cornish, Scandinavian, German, and/or Native American descent. The North-Central dialect is so strongly influenced by these areas' languages and Canada that speakers from other areas may have difficulty understanding it. Almost half the Finnish immigrants to the U.S. settled in the Upper Peninsula, some joining Scandinavians who moved on to Minnesota. Another sub-dialect is spoken in Southcentral Alaska's Matanuska-Susitna Valley, because it was settled in the 1930s (during the Great Depression) by immigrants from the North-Central dialect region.

Phonology

Not all of these characteristics are unique to the North-Central region.

Vowels
In addition to being conservative,  may be monophthongal . Regionally, monophthongal mid vowels are more common in the northern tier of states, occurring more frequently in Minnesota and the Dakotas but much rarer in Iowa and Nebraska. The appearance of monophthongs in this region is sometimes explained due to the high degree of Scandinavian and German immigration to these northern states in the late nineteenth century. Erik R. Thomas argues that these monophthongs are the product of language contact and notes that other areas where they occur are places where speakers of other languages have had an influence such as the Pennsylvania "Dutch" region. An alternative account posits that these monophthongal variants represent historical retentions. Diphthongization of the mid vowels seems to have been a relatively recent phenomenon, appearing within the last few centuries, and did not affect all dialects in the UK. The monophthongs heard in this region may stem from the influence of Scots-Irish or other British dialects that maintain such forms. The fact that the monophthongs also appear in Canadian English may lend support to this account since Scots-Irish speech is known as an important influence in Canada.
 Some or partial evidence of the Northern Cities Vowel Shift, which normally defines neighboring Inland Northern American English, exists in North-Central American English. For example,  may be generally raised and  generally fronted in comparison to other American English accents.
 Some speakers exhibit extreme raising of  before voiced velars ( and ), with an up-glide, so that bag sounds close to beg or even as raised as the first syllable of bagel. Other examples of where this applies include the word flag and agriculture.
It occurs before some voiced consonants. For example, many speakers pronounce fire, tiger, and spider with the raised vowel. Some speakers in this region raise  as well.
 The onset of  when not subject to raising is often quite far back, resulting in pronunciations like .
 The cot–caught merger is common throughout the region, and the vowel can be quite forward: .
This is highly variable, however, and these words are pronounced both ways in other parts of the country.
 The North-Central accent shows certain General American features, such as rhoticity and the Mary-marry-merry merger, as well as a lack of the pen–pin merger of the American South or the Canadian shift.

Consonants
Word-initial th-stopping is possible among speakers of working-class backgrounds, especially with pronouns ('deez' for these, 'doze' for those, 'dem' for them, etc.). In addition, traces of a pitch accent as in Swedish and Norwegian can persist in some areas of heavy Norwegian or Swedish settlement, and among people who grew up in those areas (some of whom are not of Scandinavian descent).

Phonemic incidence
Certain phonemes appear in particular words, setting the North-Central dialect apart from some other American English:
absurd often uses  (rather than )
across may end with a final , rhyming with cost, particularly in Wisconsin
anti often uses  (rather than )
aunt often uses  (rather than )
roof often uses  (rather than )
turbine often uses  (rather than ): the same pronunciation as turban

Grammar
In this dialect, the preposition with is used without an object as an adverb in phrases like come with, as in Do you want to come with? for standard Do you want to come with me? or with us?. In standard English, other prepositions can be used as adverbs, like go down (down as adverb) for go down the stairs (down as preposition). With is not typically used in this way in standard English (particularly in British and Irish English), and this feature likely came from languages spoken by some immigrants, such as Scandinavian (Danish, Swedish, Norwegian), German, or Dutch and Luxembourgish, all of which have this construction, like Danish and Swedish  or German .

The word yet can be used in a phrase such as "I need to clean this room yet" to mean 'still', particularly around Wisconsin and the Upper Peninsula. "Shut the lights" can mean "shut off the lights", particularly in that same region.

Vocabulary
 boulevard, a grassy median strip
 berm, boulevard, or terrace, a grassy road verge
 bubbler, a drinking fountain (mainly used in Wisconsin)
 breezeway or skyway, a hallway-bridge connecting two buildings
 eh?, a question tag (particularly used in the northern sections of Minnesota, Wisconsin, and Upper Michigan)
 frontage road, a service or access road
 hotdish, a simple entree (main) cooked in a single dish, like a casserole
 pop or soda pop, a sweet carbonated soft drink
 parking ramp, a multi-story parking structure
 rummage sale, a yard or garage sale
 sliver, a splinter
 spendy, expensive or high-priced
 stocking cap, a knit wool hat
 supposably (for supposedly), particularly in Wisconsin
 troll, a person from the Lower Peninsula of Michigan
 Uff da, a Scandinavian exclamation or interjection used to express dismay, surprise, astonishment, exhaustion, or relief
 Yooper, a person from the Upper Peninsula of Michigan

Sub-varieties
A North-Central "dialect island" exists in southcentral Alaska's Matanuska-Susitna Valley, since, in the 1930s, it absorbed large numbers of settlers from Michigan, Minnesota, and Wisconsin. "Yooper" English spoken in the Upper Peninsula of Michigan and Iron Range English spoken in Minnesota's Mesabi Iron Range are strong sub-varieties of the North-Central dialect, largely influenced by Fenno-Scandinavian immigration to those areas around the beginning of the twentieth century. Iron Range English is sometimes called "Rayncher" English (an eye spelling of "Ranger").

Upper Peninsula English
English of the Upper Peninsula of Michigan, plus some bordering areas of northeast Wisconsin, colloquially known as U.P. or "Yooper" English, or Yoopanese, is a North-Central sub-variety with some additional influences from Finnish-speaking immigrants to the region. However, younger speakers may be starting to align closer to nearby Standard Canadian English, according to a recent study of Marquette County.

In popular culture

The Upper Midwestern accent is made conspicuous, often to the point of parody or near-parody, in the film Fargo (especially as displayed by Frances McDormand's character Marge Gunderson) and the radio program A Prairie Home Companion (as displayed by many minor characters, especially those voiced by Sue Scott, with whom lead characters, most frequently male roles voiced by Garrison Keillor). It is also evident in the film New in Town.

Notable lifelong native speakers

Steven Avery — "recognizably thick Wisconsin accent"
Michele Bachmann  — "that calming, matzoh-flat Minnesota accent"
Charlie Berens
Jan Kuehnemund
Brock Lesnar
Don Ness — "You'll find that Ms. Palin and Duluth Mayor Don Ness don't sound all that different."
Julianne Ortman
Sarah Palin — "Listeners who hear the Minnewegian sounds of the characters from Fargo when they listen to Ms. Palin are on to something: the Matanuska-Susitna Valley in Alaska, where she grew up, was settled by farmers from Minnesota"
Mark Proksch

See also
Inland Northern American English
North American English regional phonology
Regional vocabularies of American English

Notes

References
 
 

American English
Iowa culture
Michigan culture
Languages of Minnesota
Languages of Montana
North Dakota culture
South Dakota culture
Wisconsin culture
Culture of the Midwestern United States
Montana culture